Aşağı Ləgər (also, Aşağı-ləngər) is a village and municipality in the Khachmaz Rayon of Azerbaijan. It has a population of 325.

References

Populated places in Khachmaz District